Big Flats is a community (and former census-designated place, which is now part of Big Flats CDP as of the 2010 census) located in the Town of Big Flats in Chemung County, New York, United States. As of the 2018 census, the location had a total population of 7,595. 

Big Flats is the location of the Elmira-Corning Regional Airport (ELM). It is part of the Elmira, New York Metropolitan Statistical Area.

Geography 
Big Flats is located at 42°9'48" North, 76°52'47" West (42.163424, -76.879714).

The total area is 0.34% water.

New York State Route 17 (Southern Tier Expressway) is an east–west highway crossing the area.  Note that in 2004, NYS RT17 started the process of being updated to an Interstate highway and is nearly complete. Construction for update began December 3, 1999, now with 222.3 Miles completed. Most areas now refer to it as I-86.

New York State Route 352 passes through the community of Big Flats.

The Chemung River is south of the area.

See also 
 Big Flats (CDP), New York

References

Former census-designated places in New York (state)
Populated places in Chemung County, New York